Albert Duffield (3 March 1894 – 27 September 1981), commonly known as Bert Duffield, was an English footballer who played as a full-back.

Early life
Duffield was born in Owston Ferry in Lincolnshire on 3 March 1894.

Career
Between 1912 and 1914, Duffield played for Gainsborough Trinity before serving as a bombardier in France during World War One. Following the end of the war, Duffield played for Midland League side Castleford Town before joining newly formed Leeds United in the summer of 1920. His debut for the club came on 28 August 1920 in Leeds United's first ever league match against Port Vale. Duffield made 203 league appearances in the First and Second Divisions for Leeds United before leaving to join Bradford (Park Avenue) in 1925. He retired for Bradford (Park Avenue) in June 1929 after 51 appearances.

Personal life
Following his retirement, he worked as a greengrocer before running a poultry farm in Rawcliffe. He died in Beeston in Leeds on 27 September 1981.

References

1894 births
1981 deaths
English footballers
People from the Borough of North Lincolnshire
Footballers from Lincolnshire
Association football fullbacks
Gainsborough Trinity F.C. players
Castleford Town F.C. players
Leeds United F.C. players
Bradford (Park Avenue) A.F.C. players
English Football League players